Ronald Phillip Tanaka (1944–2007) was a Japanese-American poet and editor.

Life
He was a Sansei (a third-generation Japanese-American), born in the Poston War Relocation Center in Arizona in 1944 behind barbed wire.

He attended Pomona College, Claremont and the University of California, Berkeley where he took an interdisciplinary Ph.D. Renaissance British Literature, philosophy of language and generative syntax and semantics under the tutelage of Julian C. Boyd. Ronald Tanaka taught English at the  California State University Sacramento.

He was the single parent of two girls, Shinobu and Yoi.

Awards
 1982 American Book Award for The Shino Suite: Japanese-American Poetry
 California Arts Council
 Sacramento Metropolitan Arts Commission
 Foundation of California State University, Sacramento

Works
 
 
 
Systems Models for Literary Macro-theory (1976)
"On the Metaphysical Foundations of a Sansei Poetics", Journal of Ethnic Studies

Anthologies

References

1944 births
2007 deaths
American poets
American poets of Asian descent
Pomona College alumni
University of California, Berkeley alumni
California State University, Sacramento faculty
Japanese-American internees
American writers of Japanese descent
Writers from Sacramento, California
20th-century American poets
American Book Award winners